Jana Novotná and Catherine Suire were the defending champions but only Suire competed that year with Helen Kelesi.

Kelesi and Suire lost in the first round to Sophie Amiach and Lise Gregory.

Elizabeth Smylie and Janine Tremelling won in the final 6–4, 6–3 against Manon Bollegraf and Mercedes Paz.

Seeds
Champion seeds are indicated in bold text while text in italics indicates the round in which those seeds were eliminated. The top five seeded teams received byes into the second round.

Draw

Final

Top half

Bottom half

External links
 1989 Italian Open Women's Doubles Draw

Women's Doubles